Zvole is a municipality and village in Šumperk District in the Olomouc Region of the Czech Republic. It has about 800 inhabitants.

Notable people
František Hoplíček (1890–1946), painter and athlete

References

Villages in Šumperk District